Wincenty is a given name. Notable people with the name include:

Ryszard Wincenty Berwiński (1817–1879), Polish poet
Wincenty Budzyński (1815–1866), Polish politician agent and Polish–French chess master
Wincenty de Lesseur (born 1745), eighteenth-century Polish painter
Wincenty Dunin-Marcinkiewicz (c. 1808 – 1884), Belarusian writer, poet, dramatist and social activist
Stefan Wincenty Frelichowski (1913–1945), Polish priest, scout and patron of Polish Scouts
Wincenty Godlewski or Vincent Hadleŭski (1898–1942), Belarusian Roman Catholic priest, publicist and politician
Wincenty Gostkowski (1807–1884), lawyer and associate in the watchmaker Patek Philippe & Co. in Geneva, Switzerland
Wincenty Kadłubek (1161–1223), thirteenth century Bishop of Cracow and historian of Poland
Wincenty Korwin Gosiewski (1620–1662), Polish-Lithuanian politician and military commander, a notable member of the szlachta
Wincenty Kowalski (1892–1984), Polish military commander and a general of the Polish Army
Wincenty Krasiński (1782–1858), Polish nobleman (szlachcic), political activist and military leader
Wincenty Lewoniuk, one of the Pratulin Martyrs, 13 Greek Catholic (Uniate) believers killed by the Russian Army in 1874
Wincenty Lutosławski (1863–1954), Polish philosopher, author, and member of the Polish National League
Wincenty Niemojowski (1784–1834), Polish political activist in Congress Poland
Wincenty of Kielcza (born 1200), Polish canon in Cracow, a poet writing in Latin, composer, member of the Dominican Order
Wincenty Okołowicz (1906–1979), Polish geographer and an expert in geomorphology and climatology
Wincenty Pol (1807–1872), Polish poet and geographer
Hieronim Wincenty Radziwiłł (1759–1786), Polish-Lithuanian nobleman and Knight of the Order of the White Eagle
Wincenty Rzymowski (1883–1950), Polish politician and writer
Wincenty Witos (1874–1945), prominent member of the Polish People's Party (PSL) from 1895, and leader of its "Piast" faction from 1913
Wincenty Wodzinowski (1866–1940), Polish painter
Wincenty Zakrzewski (1844–1918), Polish historian

See also
Vincent
Wincenta
Wincentynów
Wincentów (disambiguation)
Winsen (disambiguation)